Riverside High School is a public high school located in Durham, North Carolina. The principal of Riverside High is Dr. Gloria Woods-Weeks, who joined as principal in 2021. Current members of the school administrative team include Will Okun, Chaundra Clay, Jasmine McKoy, and Tammy Patterson.
The school enrolls students from grades 9–12. The school was founded in 1991 and became one of the seven Durham Public High Schools.

History

Riverside High School opened in 1991 (the first class graduated in 1993) and currently enrolls approximately 1,700 students. It is one of seven high schools in the Durham Public School System. The school offers classes on a block schedule on a semester basis, with students taking 4 classes—generally 2 core and 2 elective—each semester. Riverside is an accredited school and is also home to the Durham Public Schools' engineering program, which uses the national Project Lead the Way curriculum.

Riverside's sixteen sports teams are part of the PAC-6 Conference, which includes schools in Durham County and the neighboring counties of Orange and Person. The school has fielded several state champions in football, wrestling, men's lacrosse, volleyball, and swimming.

In 2017 the principal, Tonya Williams, proposed a "SMART Lunch" program where there is a single lunch period that is one hour long and students are free to attend certain clubs, replacing the former scheme where students are assigned to one of three lunch slots at different times in the school day. It was enacted in fall 2019.

Achievements

In 2007, Riverside was ranked as the 834th high school in America by Newsweek.

In 2011, Riverside's Student Newspaper, The Pirates' Hook, was awarded the best student run newspaper in North Carolina.

Athletics
Riverside High School sports teams are known as the Pirates. The school is a member of the North Carolina High School Athletic Association (NCHSAA).

Wrestling
The Pirate wrestling team has won seven state championships.

Volleyball

Riverside's girls volleyball program has won two state championships.

Notable alumni
 Scott Brown – writer, director, and comedian
 Jeffrey Gunter – NFL linebacker
 Mary Katharine Ham – journalist, senior writer at The Federalist, CNN contributor, and former Fox News contributor
 Chef Henny – rapper
 Megan Hodge – indoor volleyball silver medalist at the 2012 Summer Olympics
 Anthony King – writer, director, and comedian
 Weslye Saunders – NFL tight end
 Abel Trujillo – mixed martial artist who competed in the lightweight division in the UFC
 T. J. Warren – NBA player

References

Public high schools in North Carolina
Durham Public Schools
Schools in Durham County, North Carolina
1991 establishments in North Carolina
Educational institutions established in 1991